Aashirwad (transl. Blessing) is a 1968 Bollywood film, directed by Hrishikesh Mukherjee. The film main stars Ashok Kumar, Veena, Sumita Sanyal and Sanjeev Kumar. The film is notable for Ashok Kumar & Veena life time performances and   its also inclusion of a rap-like song performed by Ashok Kumar, "Rail Gaadi"  & "Nav Chali".

Plot summary

The protagonist Jogi Thakur (Ashok Kumar) is a simple man of high principles. He is a resident son-in-law who, with his wife, has been bequeathed property and estates by his father-in-law. He breaks his marriage to an autocratic landlady (Veena) when he finds out that on his wife's order, the chief accountant of the estate has cunningly obtained his signatures on an order that the houses of the poor be burnt. He leaves home, vowing never to return as long as he lives, leaving his daughter Neena behind. He moves to Mumbai where he makes a living by entertaining children in a park (the famous song "Rail Gaadi", said to be India's first rap number). He is specially fond of a girl whose name, incidentally, is Neena (played by baby Sarika), too.  Unfortunately, the girl takes ill and dies.

Jogi then returns to his village, Chandanpur, where he finds that the daughter of one of his villager friends, Baiju, has been abducted.  He rushes someplace where she is about to be raped by the estate's cunning chief accountant, and he kills him to protect the girl.  The villagers make up a phony story to save him, but he opts to tell the truth in the court and is jailed. There, he starts tending to the garden and composes philosophical poems. The doctor at the jail, Dr. Biren (Sanjeev Kumar) takes a special liking to him. Coincidentally, Neena, Jogi Thakur's daughter is set to be married with the doctor.  Jogi Thakur finds this out by chance as he is tending to the garden outside doctor's room and overhears their conversations.  He also learns that his daughter hates criminals.  And so he shields his face from her on the few occasions that they meet. Unfortunately, he takes ill just as he is granted pardon by the government for his good behaviour. The doctor,  has come to think of him as a father figure.  He tells Jogi Thakur that the day he will be out of jail will be the eve of his marriage. Jogi Thakur is taken by the desire to see his daughter being wedded, and hurries to see her.  However, he does not want anyone to recognize him.  Finally he joins the beggars who have gathered for a treat for the marriage, where his daughter and son-in-law are serving food.  He manages to give his blessings to her and hurries out.  However, as he collapses on the road, he is recognized and people gather around him.  The news reaches his daughter who rushes to the spot to meet with her father at his last moment.

Adorned with such wonderful songs such as "Rail Gaadi" sung by Ashok Kumar himself, "Ek Tha Bachpan" by Lata Mangeshkar (sung by Jogi Thakur's daughter) and finally the memorable "Jeevan Se Lambe Hai Bandhu Yeh Jeevan Ke Raste" by Manna Dey (sung by the bullock-cart driver who carries Jogi Thakur near his village in the night), the movie is an emotional journey through a man's life who stands by his principles only to be finally overcome by love for his daughter.

Cast
 Ashok Kumar as Shivnath "Jogi Thakur" Choudhary
 Sanjeev Kumar as Doctor Biren
 Sumita Sanyal as Neena "Bittu" S. Choudhary
 Veena (actress) as Leela S. Choudhary, Rani maa
 Sajjan (actor) as Ramdas munimji
 Harindranath Chattopadhyay as Baiju "Dholakia"
 Padma Khanna as Rukmini
 Bipin Gupta
 S.N. Banerjee as Mohan/Mamaji
 Amar Kumar
 Brahm Bhardwaj advocate for Jogi Thakur
 Leela Gandhi as dancer in 'Saf Karo, insaf karo'
 Abhi Bhattacharya	as Jailor
 Sarika as Munni/Neena
 Baby Deepali as young Neena/Bittu
 Dev Kishan as Mahadev street movie vendor
 Harbans Darshan M Arora as Munni's (Sarika) father
 Kedarnath Saigal as radio broadcaster (Ek tha bachpan)
 Amol Sen as guard of medical ward in jail.
 Ashim Kumar as bullock cart driver (Jeevan se lambe hai bandhu)

Soundtrack

The music of the film was by Vasant Desai, with lyrics by Gulzar. Harindranath Chattopadhyay wrote the song "Rail Gaadi..."
 "Ik Tha Bachpan" - Lata Mangeshkar
 "Rail Gaadi Chhuk Chhuk Chhuk Chhuk" - Ashok Kumar
 "Jeevan Se Lambe Hain Bandhu Yeh Jeevan Ke Raste" - Manna Dey
 "Jhirjhir Barse" - Lata Mangeshkar
 "Saf Karo, insaf karo" - Asha Bhosle, Manna Dey, Ashok Kumar
 "Kanno ki ek nagri thi" - Ashok Kumar, Harindranath Chattopadhyay
 "Naav chali" - Ashok Kumar

Awards
1969 Filmfare Best Actor Award for Ashok Kumar
1969 National Film Award for Best Actor for Ashok Kumar
1969 National Film Award for Best Feature Film in Hindi

References

External links
 
Rail Gaadi at Geeta-Kavita.com

1968 films
1960s Hindi-language films
Films directed by Hrishikesh Mukherjee
Films featuring a Best Actor National Award-winning performance
Best Hindi Feature Film National Film Award winners